Jens Bjerre (16 March 1921 – 17 February 2020) was a Danish author, filmmaker and adventurer. He trained as a journalist at newspapers in provincial Denmark before becoming political editor at Aftenbladet in Copenhagen in 1943–47. During the German occupation of Denmark, Bjerre was active in the resistance group BOPA. In 1947, Bjerre embarked on a lifelong career as a freelance journalist by going to South Africa, where he lived among the San bushmen and studied their culture and customs. The following year, he returned and shot the documentary movie Kalahari, which gives an insight into the lives and rituals of this ancient people. In the mid-1960s, Bjerre spent almost a year among the nomadic aborigines of the Northern Territory in Australia. Jens Bjerre wrote five books about his travels and encounters with primitive people, which have been translated into 15 languages. His latest book was the memories Lost Worlds from (2005). Bjerre was chairman of the  Danish branch of The Adventures Club in 1977.

Travel writer 
In 1947, Bjerre began working as a freelance travel journalist. He wrote articles for numerous Danish and international newspapers and magazines such as Life Magazine, Paris Match and The London Illustrated News, and he also produced radio features from Africa for the BBC.

Scientific expeditions and lectures 
Bjerre conducted scientific expeditions to the Kalahari desert and the interior of Australia in collaboration with The Royal Geographical Society in London and the National Museum in Copenhagen. Furthermore, he participated in several mapping expeditions to unknown areas of New Guinea on behalf of the Australian government. He also co-organized and participated in the University of Copenhagen's Noona Dan-expedition to the Pacific in 1961–62. Furthermore, he collected cultural artefacts among tribal people in New Guinea for the Danish National Museum.
Bjerre lectured on universities and museums throughout the world, among them Harvard, Yale, Stanford and National Geographic Society in Washington and the Royal Geographical Society in London. He was also a speaker at the international congress of anthropologists in Moscow in 1964.

Bibliography in Danish 
 Blandt menneskeædere på Ny Guinea, 1955.
 Kalahari – Atomtidens stenalder, 1958.
 Gensyn med Stenalderen, 1963.
 Endnu lever eventyret, 1971. '
 Forsvundne verdner – 50 år blandt naturfolk , 2005.

Danish documentaries 
 Blandt menneskeædere på Ny Guinea
 Fra Cairo til Cap
 Himalaya. Verdens tag
 Kalahari. Afrikas buskmænd
 Atomtidens stenalderfolk. Australiens aboriginals
 På togt med Noona Dan
 Sydhavets glemte folk
 Det nye Kina
 Indiens sjæl

References

Sources 
 Jens Bjerre: Lost Worlds, 2005 (autobiography)
 Portrait at www.gyldendal.dk/jens-bjerre (in Danish)

1921 births
2020 deaths
20th-century Danish journalists
Danish film directors
Danish explorers
Danish travel writers
21st-century Danish journalists
Danish expatriates in South Africa